A municipality is a local government unit (LGU) in the Philippines. It is distinct from city, which is a different category of local government unit. Provinces of the Philippines are divided into cities and municipalities, which in turn, are divided into barangays (formerly barrios) – villages. , there are 1,488 municipalities across the country.

A municipality is the official term for, and the official local equivalent of, a town, the latter being its archaic term and in all of its literal local translations including Filipino. Both terms are interchangeable.

A municipal district is a now-defunct local government unit; previously certain areas were created first as municipal districts before they were converted into municipalities.

History
The era of the formation of municipalities in the Philippines started during the Spanish rule, in which the colonial government founded hundreds of towns and villages across the archipelago modeled after towns and villages in Spain. They were then grouped together along with a centralized town center called cabecera or poblacion where the ayuntamiento, or town hall, was located; the poblacion served as the nucleus of each municipality. Only the communities that were permanently settled under the reduccion system, and have fully converted into Catholicism, are allowed to form municipalities, while others that have not yet been fully converted are to be subdued until conditions permitted for them to be incorporated as municipalities. As time passed, municipalities were created out of already existing ones, leading to them becoming smaller in area over time. Each municipality was governed by a capitan, usually a member of native principalia of the town, who have the task of remitting revenues to the central government in Manila. Ever since its inception to the present day, the term "municipality" holds the same definition as "town" when the first towns grew in size under the Spanish pueblo system (pueblo meaning "town" in Spanish language) to be granted municipal charters, hence the current official term for such type of settlements.

During the American administration, the municipal system put in place by the preceding Spanish authorities was preserved and at the same time reformed with greater inclusiveness among all Filipinos. Municipal districts, which were in essence unincorporated areas presided over by local tribal chiefs set up by American authorities, were created for the first time in 1914. More municipalities were created during this time, especially in Mindanao where there was a massive influx of settlers from the Luzon and the Visayas. After a while the independent Republic of the Philippines was declared in 1946, all municipal districts were dissolved and were absorbed into or broken into municipalities. The latest guidelines in the creation of new municipalities were introduced in 1991 with the issuance of the Local Government Code.

Responsibilities and powers
Municipalities have some autonomy from the National Government of the Republic of the Philippines under the Local Government Code of 1991. They have been granted corporate personality enabling them to enact local policies and laws, enforce them, and govern their jurisdictions. They can enter into contracts and other transactions through their elected and appointed officials and can tax. They are tasked with enforcing all laws, whether local or national. The National Government assists and supervises the local government to make sure that they do not violate national law. Local Governments have their own executive and legislative branches and the checks and balances between these two major branches, along with their separation, are more pronounced than that of the national government.  The Judicial Branch of the Republic of the Philippines also caters to the needs of local government units. Local governments, such as a municipalities, do not have their own judicial branch: their judiciary is the same as that of the national government.

Organization
According to Chapter II, Title II, Book III of Republic Act 7160 or the Local Government Code of 1991, a municipality shall mainly have a mayor (alkalde), a vice mayor (ikalawang alkalde/bise alkalde) and members (kagawad) of the legislative branch Sangguniang Bayan alongside a secretary to the said legislature.

The following positions are also required for all municipalities across the Philippines:

 Treasurer
 Assessor
 Accountant
 Budget Officer
 Planning and Development Coordinator
 Engineer/Building Official
 Health Officer
 Civil Registrar
 Municipal Disaster Risks Reduction and Management Officer

Depending on the need to do so, the municipal mayor may also appoint the following municipal positions:

 Administrator
 Legal Officer
 Agriculturist
 Architect
 Information Officer
 Tourism Officer
 Municipal Environment and Natural Resources Officer
 Municipal Social Welfare and Development Officer

Duties and functions
As mentioned in Title II, Book III of Republic Act 7160, the municipal mayor is the chief executive officer of the municipal government and shall determine guidelines on local policies and direct formulation of development plans. These responsibilities shall be under approval of the Sangguniang Bayan.

The vice mayor (bise-alkalde) shall sign all warrants drawn on the municipal treasury. Being presiding officer of the Sangguniang Bayan (English: Municipal Council), he can as well appoint members of the municipal legislature except its twelve (12) regular members or kagawad who are also elected every local election alongside the municipal mayor and vice mayor. In circumstances where the mayor permanently or temporarily vacates the position, he shall assume executive duties and functions.

While vice mayor presides over the legislature, he cannot vote unless the necessity of tie-breaking arises. Laws or ordinances proposed by the Sangguniang Bayan, however, may be approved or vetoed by the mayor. If approved, they become local ordinances. If the mayor neither vetoes nor approves the proposal of the Sangguniang Bayan for ten (10) days from the time of receipt, the proposal becomes law as if it had been signed. If vetoed, the draft is sent back to the Sangguniang Bayan. The latter may override the mayor by a vote of at least two-thirds (2/3) of all its members, in which case, the proposal becomes law.

A municipality, upon reaching certain requirements (such as minimum population size, and minimum annual revenue) may opt to become a city. First, a bill must be passed in Congress, then signed into law by the President and then the residents would vote in the resulting plebiscite to accept or reject cityhood. One benefit in being a city is that the city government gets more budget, but taxes are much higher than in municipalities.

Income classification
Municipalities are divided into income classes according to their average annual income during the previous four calendar years:

See also
 Sangguniang Bayan
 List of cities and municipalities in the Philippines
 List of renamed cities and municipalities in the Philippines

References

Sources

 
Subdivisions of the Philippines
Philippines 2
Municipalities, Philippines